Penicillium roseopurpureum is an anamorph species of fungus in the genus Penicillium which produces Carviolin.

References

Further reading 
 
 
 
 
 
 
 

roseopurpureum
Fungi described in 1901